Marco Ravaioli (born 29 July 1989) is an Italian motorcycle racer. He has competed in the 125cc World Championship, the Italian CIV 125GP Championship and the Italian CIV Superstock 600 Championship.

Career statistics

Grand Prix motorcycle racing

By season

Races by year

External links
 Profile on MotoGP.com
 Profile on WorldSBK.com

1989 births
People from Cesena
Living people
Italian motorcycle racers
125cc World Championship riders
Sportspeople from the Province of Forlì-Cesena